Flesh and Blood is a mystery novel by Jonathan Kellerman

Plot summary
Alex receives a call from the mother of an ex-patient, Lauren Teague. Considering it unresolved business, Alex contacts Milo and they ask around to see if they can find her. Her body turns up and the missing person case turns into a murder investigation.

Alex and Milo visit her parents, former co-workers, roommates, and employers. They follow connections back and find that Lauren had $350,000 saved up, probably earned from prostitution. She had recently started to attend college, and was part of an intimacy experiment. When a former co-worker ends up dead after speaking to them, they know the murder was no ordinary mugging. Then Lauren's mother is killed, presumably by her husband.

While kayaking along the beach near the Duke mansion, Alex rescues a boy who had swum out too far. This gets him invited in, and he makes the acquaintance of Duke's ex-wife, Cheryl. They flirt, and when a rendezvous is arranged, the killer shows up and shoots Cheryl. Alex is saved by Lauren's brother, Ben Dugger.

Title origin
Lauren was killed by Cheryl, her newfound father's ex-wife, as it turns out the family she grew up with was not her own. The phrase "flesh and blood" is often used to refer to family.

Characters
Alex Delaware - Psychologist
Milo Sturgis - Police detective
Lauren Teague - Delaware's patient and murder victim

Release details
2001, U.S., Random House, Pub date 1 December 2001, Hardcover
2002, U.S., Ballantine, Pub date 1 October 2002, Paperback

Sources, references, external links, quotations

2001 American novels
Novels by Jonathan Kellerman